Hikayat Merong Mahawangsa (Jawi: حكاية مروڠ مهاوڠسا ), alternatively spelt Hikayat Marong Mahawangsa and also known as the Kedah Annals, is a Malay literary work that gives a romantic account of the history and tales relating to the Malay kingdom, kingdom of Kedah. The work is thought to have been written in the late 10-11th century and translated in the 19th century. Although it contains historical facts, there are also many incredible assertions in its accounts. The era covered by the text ranged from the opening of Kedah by Merong Mahawangsa, described as a descendant of Dhu al-Qarnayn until the acceptance of Islam.

Summary
The beginning part of the story elaborates on the stories of kings and the founding of their kingdoms based on myths, legends or fantastical folk stories, whether its origins are indigenous or influenced by Hindu or Islamic elements. The annals tells of the forefather of all the Kedahan rulers, Raja Merong Mahawangsa; a king who not only has family ties to the King of the Romans but also the trust of the emperor's dignitaries.

The royal fleet of Merong Mahawangsa, on its way of sailing from Rome to China, was suddenly attacked by a legendary giant phoenix called Garuda. He crashed into the shores of what is now Kedah. There, he founded a state called Langkasuka ('Langkha' meaning 'resplendent land' in Sanskrit, while 'sukkha' meaning 'joy' or 'happiness') and became its king. He returned to Rome after his son Raja Merong Mahapudisat was enthroned. Langkasuka eventually changed its name to the Kedah Zamin Turan.

Guided by the advice given by his father, Mahapudisat would later divide the Kingdom into three; Kingdom of Siam to his eldest son, Kingdom of Perak to his second and Kingdom of Pattani to his youngest. The youngest son succeeded their father as King of Kedah with the title of Raja Seri Mahawangsa. Raja Seri Mahawangsa began the tradition of sending "flowers of gold and silver" as gifts to the Siamese King every time he bore a son.

Raja Seri Mahawangsa dies of a broken heart upset with his son who was disobedient of the order. His son succeeded him with the title of Raja Seri Inderawangsa. Next in line was Inderawangsa's son Raja Ong Maha Perita Deria, also known as Raja Bersiong, or the Fanged King. When the king was overthrown by his subjects due to his wickedness, his son was enthroned with the title of Raja Phra Ong Mahapudisat. Phra Ong Mahapudisat was succeeded by his son, Raja Phra Ong Mahawangsa who later converted into Islam. Sheikh Abdullah Yamani Mudzafar changed his name to Sultan Mudzafar Shah.

The annals also describe the Chola Empire's trade relations with Kedah, where the Kedah Sultanate sends its tribute to the empire every year and after to the Siam. We still can find the antique and god statue of Chola Dynasty in Kedah. The Kedahan royal family that rules to this day traces their lineages back to Phra Ong Mahawangsa, and thus Merong Mahawangsa.

The descendants of Merong Mahawangsa
Below is the list of the eight rulers of Langkasuka, Merong and his descendants, according to the Kedah Annals:
 Raja Merong Mahawangsa: A ruler from Rome who later settled in Bujang Valley and founded the Kingdom of Langkasuka. He is said to be a descendant to Alexander the Great. Merong had three sons, Merong Mahapudisat, Ganjil Sarjuna, and Seri Mahawangsa, and a daughter, Raja Puteri, who is the second youngest in the family. He was later succeeded by his eldest son, Merong Mahapudisat. Merong then left to Rome, leaving his son the ruler of Langkasuka.
 Raja Merong Mahapudisat: He became the king of Langkasuka after his father, Merong Mahawangsa went back to  Rome. He was the eldest son. Legends say that he was also the first king of Siam.
 Raja Ganji Sarjuna: He was crowned king after his brother's death. He was the second eldest in the family. He founded the Gangga Negara kingdom.
 Raja Puteri (in English, King Princess): She became the King of Langkasuka after her brother Ganjil Sarjuna died. She is the youngest daughter in the family. She was also the first ruler of Pattani.
 Raja Seri Mahawangsa: He became the king of Langkasuka after his brother, Ganjil Sarjuna died.
 Raja Ong Maha Perita Deria: He is the son of Raja Seri Maha Inderawangsa, who is the grandson of Raja Merong Mahawangsa. His father was married to an ogre. He was called "Raja Bersiong" or the Fanged King because of his cannibalistic behaviour of drinking human blood. He was the successor of Raja Seri Maha Inderawangsa, but because of his behaviour, the ministers of the kingdom had no choice but to revolt against him. He fled to Mount Jerai, where he remained hidden for a long time and later had a son, who was called Phra Ong Mahapudisat. His son, unknowing of his royal lineage, lived in his mother's village before being called to the palace and had his identity revealed. The story of "Raja Bersiong" has been read as a symbol of a pre-Islamic order. 
 King Phra Ong Mahapudisat: After Seri Mahawangsa's death, Langkasuka needed a successor that had a royal blood. Phra Ong Mahapudist was crowned king after his father's death.
 Sultan Mudzafar Shah, Phra Ong Mahawangsa: He was the only son of Phra Ong Mahapudisat. He was originally Hindu, but when Islam first came to the Malay Peninsula, he became a Muslim, changed his name into Sultan Mudzafar Shah, and the Kingdom of Langkasuka into the Kedah Sultanate.

In popular culture
KD Mahawangsa is a vessel of the Royal Malaysian Navy named in honour of the first monarch.

Raja Bersiong was a 1968 Malay-language film based on the legend of the sixth monarch and his alleged cannibalism.

A 2011 epic action adventure film loosely based on the myth was produced by KRU Studios also titled Hikayat Merong Mahawangsa (also known by its international title The Malay Chronicles: Bloodlines), directed by Yusry Abdul Halim.

See also
 Hikayat Hang Tuah
 Sejarah Melayu
 Sultanate of Kedah

References

External links
 Hikayat Merong Mahawangsa - A manuscript at Universiti Kebangsaan Malaysia
 

Malay-language literature